The 2015 Men's World Team Squash Championships is the men's edition of the 2015 World Team Squash Championships, which serves as the world team championship for squash players. Courtesy of the World Squash Federation and Egyptian Squash Association, the event was scheduled to take place in Cairo, Egypt from December 12 to December 18, 2015; with short notice, it was postponed in the wake of several team withdrawals arising from security concerns and a bomb attack in the Egyptian capital that resulted in 16 fatalities.

On 27 January 2016, the event was formally cancelled; the next edition of the championships will be held in 2017.

See also 
World Team Squash Championships
World Squash Federation
2015 Men's World Open Squash Championship

References

External links 
World Squash Federation Website
Men's World Teams moves from Kuwait to Cairo, same dates  - WSF notice

Sports competitions in Cairo
World Squash Championships
W
2015 in Egyptian sport
Squash in Egypt